The 12th Australian Academy of Cinema and Television Arts Awards (generally known as the AACTA Awards) was an award's ceremony to celebrate the best of Australian films and television of 2022. The main ceremony occurred on 7 December 2022 at the Hordern Pavilion in Sydney and was broadcast on Network 10 and Fox Arena. The recipient of the Longford Lyell Award was costume, production and set designer Catherine Martin. The recipient of the Trailblazer Award was actor Chris Hemsworth.

Feature film
The nominations are as follows:

Television

Documentary

Short form and digital

Additional awards

References

External links
 Official AACTA website

AACTA Awards ceremonies
2022 in Australian cinema